John McMullin  (born c. 1935) is an American professional golfer who played on the PGA Tour in the 1950s and 1960s.

McMullin was born in Richmond, California. He was a pupil of noted black golf instructor Lucius Bateman, whose other students included future PGA Tour winners Don Whitt, Dick Lotz and Tony Lema. McMullin attended Modesto Junior College, where he was a member of the golf team. He was the individual medalist at the Western Intercollegiate Golf Tournament in 1955.

McMullin had several top-10 finishes in his PGA Tour career including a win at the 1958 Hesperia Open Invitational and a solo 2nd-place finish at the 1959 Tijuana Open Invitational. His best finish in a major championship was T35 at the 1959 PGA Championship.

After his touring days were over, McMullin became the golf course professional at Palo Alto Municipal Golf Course.

Amateur wins
1953 Northern California Junior Championship
1955 Western Intercollegiate (individual)
1956 Western Open Golf Championship
1956 California State Fair Championship

Professional wins (5)

PGA Tour wins (1)

PGA Tour playoff record (0–1)

Other wins (4)
this list may be incomplete
1957 Montebello Open
1965 Northern California Open
1966 Northern California PGA Championship
1967 Northern California PGA Championship

References

American male golfers
PGA Tour golfers
Golfers from California
Sportspeople from Richmond, California
1930s births
Living people